Merry Comes to Town is a 1937 British comedy film directed by George King and starring Zasu Pitts, Guy Newall and Betty Ann Davies. It was made at Shepperton Studios.

Cast
 Zasu Pitts as Winnie Oatfield  
 Guy Newall as Prof. John Stafford  
 Betty Ann Davies as Marjorie Stafford  
 Stella Arbenina as Mme. Saroni  
 Bernard Clifton as Dennis Stafford  
 Margaret Watson as Grandmother Stafford  
 Basil Langton as Noel Slater  
 Muriel George as Cook  
 Tom Helmore as Peter Bell  
 Cecil Mannering as Horace Bell  
 George Sims as Sales Manager  
 W.T. Ellwanger as Mr. Ramp 
 Arthur Finn as Mr. Walheimer  
 Sybil Grove as Zoe  
 Dorothy Bush  
 Hermione Gingold as Ida Witherspoon  
 Mabel Twemlow as Mrs. C. Wriggle 
 Jack Hellier
 Janet Fitzpatrick as Woman 
 Margaret Yarde

References

Bibliography
 Low, Rachael. Filmmaking in 1930s Britain. George Allen & Unwin, 1985.
 Wood, Linda. British Films, 1927-1939. British Film Institute, 1986.

External links

1937 films
British comedy films
1937 comedy films
Films directed by George King
Films shot at Shepperton Studios
British black-and-white films
1930s English-language films
1930s British films